Saint-Michel-sous-Bois is a commune in the Pas-de-Calais department in the Hauts-de-France region of France.

Geography
Saint-Michel-sous-Bois is located 9 miles (15.5 km) northeast of Montreuil-sur-Mer on the D129 road.

Population

Places of interest
 The church of St. Michel, dating from the seventeenth century

See also
Communes of the Pas-de-Calais department

References

Saintmichelsousbois